The Pecos Wilderness is a protected wilderness area within the Santa Fe National Forest and Carson National Forest. The Pecos Wilderness lies within the Camino Real Ranger District of the Carson National Forest, and the Pecos Ranger District and Espanola Ranger District of the Santa Fe National Forest. 
The Pecos Wilderness includes the southernmost extension of the Rocky Mountains in the sub-range of the Sangre de Cristo Mountains of north central New Mexico. One trail head for the wilderness is only 15 miles by road from Santa Fe, the state capital. Covering an area of (350 sq mi) it is the second largest wilderness in the state after the Gila Wilderness. Congress protected an additional  in 1980. The Wilderness boasts one of the highest concentrations of peaks exceeding  in elevation in New Mexico, including Santa Fe Baldy, the highest point in Santa Fe County, and South Truchas Peak, the second highest peak in the state.

U.S. Wilderness Areas do not allow motorized or mechanized vehicles, including bicycles. Camping and fishing are allowed with proper permit, but no roads, buildings, logging or mining are permitted.  Wilderness areas within National Forests and Bureau of Land Management areas allow hunting in season.

History 
Little archaeological or historical research has been conducted within the Pecos Wilderness. However, researchers have found artifacts dating back to the Paleo-Indian Period (7,000-6,000 B.C). Most artifacts found date back to the late Archaic period (900 B.C-400 A.D). These items have been dated back to late pueblo and Anasazi times. Ultimately, none of the sites surveyed display proof of long-term occupation. It is thought that use by indigenous people was seasonal and temporary. Groups would hunt and gather in the mountains during the summer months and return to lower elevations in the winter. The first known occupation of the Pecos Wilderness began in 1598 with the colonization by Spain. During the next 200 years, they would push into the fertile lands that flanked the Sangre de Cristo Mountain range. New Mexico was annexed to the United States following the Mexican war of 1846. In 1875 mineral prospecting began. George Beatty was an early pioneer who built a cabin at the junction of the Pecos River and the Rito del Padre. Beatty flats are named after him.

Environment 

The high altitude of the Pecos provides a cool change from the lower deserts and brushlands. Temperatures vary with season and elevation. Summer daytime temperatures average 70 °F, dropping to lows of 30 °F at nighttime. Fall and springtime highs range from the 50s to lows in the teens. Winter temperatures below 0° are not uncommon. May and June are usually dry months, and July and August typically come with showers and thunderstorms. Annual precipitation is from 35 to 40 inches. About half comes during summer and half in winter.

The Pecos Wilderness is made up of deep and narrow canyons, long and broad mesa tops, heavily forested slopes, and rugged ridges with peaks above timberline characterize the Sangre de Cristo Mountains of the Pecos Wilderness. This small mountain chain occupies the extreme southern extent of the Rocky Mountains.

Fifteen lakes across the Pecos offer fishing and fly fishing to locals, tourists, and natives. The Pecos has around 150 miles of streams holding rainbow trout, brown trout, and cutthroat trout.

The scenery ranges from 100-foot waterfalls and crumbled talus slopes to dramatic cliff rocks, towering peaks, and wildflower meadows.

Topography 
The Pecos Wilderness is a heavily forested, high-elevation and rugged mountain land, ranging from 8,400 feet to over 13,000 feet. Truchas Peak, at 13,103 feet, is the second highest point in New Mexico. River valleys and streams are separated by long, broad mesas. The Sangre de Cristo Mountains run northeast to southwest across the wilderness, separating broad mesas to the east from rugged canyons and ridges to the west.

Wildlife 
The forest of the wilderness consists of Engelmann spruce, corkbark fir, ponderosa pine, Douglas fir, white fir, limber pine, bristlecone pine, and aspen trees. In addition to the various types of trees, the Pecos has a diverse wildlife. Elk, deer, coyotes, bear, turkey, squirrels, beavers, and a herd of Rocky Mountain bighorn sheep,  are found in the Pecos region. Furthermore, there is a bird population made up of white-tailed ptarmigan, blue grouse, Steller's jay, raven, raptors and a variety of different species of hummingbirds and woodpeckers.

Reference list

External links
 Forest service page about Pecos Wilderness

Wilderness areas of New Mexico
Protected areas of Mora County, New Mexico
Protected areas of Rio Arriba County, New Mexico
Protected areas of San Miguel County, New Mexico
Protected areas of Santa Fe County, New Mexico
Protected areas of Taos County, New Mexico
National Forests of the Rocky Mountains
IUCN Category Ib
Carson National Forest
Santa Fe National Forest
Sangre de Cristo Mountains
Pecos River
Protected areas established in 1980
1980 establishments in New Mexico